OutsideXbox, or Oxbox, is a British YouTube channel and group consisting of Jane Douglas, Andy Farrant, and Mike Channell. The group also has a sister channel, Outside Xtra, or Oxtra, consisting of Luke Westaway and Ellen Rose. The group is best known for video games commentary, journalism, and gameplay. The channel also hosts the Oxventure, a tabletop role-playing game (TTRPG) Dungeons & Dragons and Blades in the Dark series featuring fellow YouTuber Johnny Chiodini. The group has a combined 3.49 million subscribers and 1.49 billion views as of May 2021.

Members 
The following people are part of OutsideXbox and its associated channels:

Editors:
 Andy Farrant – part of OutsideXbox 
 Jane Douglas – part of OutsideXbox 
 Mike Channell – part of OutsideXbox 
 Ellen Rose – part of Outside Xtra 
 Luke Westaway – part of Outside Xtra 

Producers:
 James Hills – video producer
 Jon Garnham – video producer

Series regulars:
 Johnny Chiodini - Dungeon Master and role-player

History 

OutsideXbox was launched in 2012 by the then EuroGamer Network (now Gamer Network) as a website focused on Xbox gaming and its community. The founding members all had previous games journalism experience: Andy Farrant was part of Inside Xbox in Europe; Jane Douglas was working with GameSpot; and Mike Channell previously worked for the magazine PC Format and was the UK deputy editor of the Official Xbox Magazine. The group expanded in 2016 to include a second channel, Outside Xtra, to cover the wider games industry beyond Xbox. New members included Luke Westaway, previously a CNET senior editor and contributor to Nintendo Life; and Ellen Rose, who worked for Attention Seekers' official Xbox channel Xbox On.

In 2019, Douglas was named as one of the 100 Most Influential Women in the UK games industry for her work at OutsideXbox.

On 24 June 2021 Hitman 3 released featured contracts on the Dartmoor map curated by Farrant, Douglas and Channell focused on stealth, poison, and explosions. This was part of the game's Season 3 Seven Deadly Sins DLC content, specifically Act 3: Season of Sloth.

Oxventure 
Both OutsideXbox channels began the Oxventure Dungeons & Dragons campaign in 2017 with Johnny Chiodini as Dungeon Master. The Oxventure began a podcast in August 2020 hosted by Jane Douglas to replay old D&D sessions and chat with other members of OutsideXbox. At New York Comic Con x MCM Metaverse 2020 the Oxventure did three virtual sessions of the TTRPG Lasers & Feelings on 14 August 2020, 10 October 2020, and 11 June 2021. On 8 January 2021, the Oxventure began a Blades in the Dark series.

The Oxventure released a Dungeons & Dragons appreciation music video and single "Literally Everyone Else in the World" on 27 November 2019. It also had elements reflecting the upcoming Christmas holiday. The song's title is a reference to a Dungeon Master's role of being responsible for all NPC's in a fictional world combined with DM Johnny Chiodini's introduction for themself to the audience. Luke Westaway and Andy Farrant wrote the single with Farrant playing bass guitar for the track. Vocals were provided by all five Outside Xbox and Xtra editors with CNET editor Andrew Hoyle on the drum. All proceeds from the single and its live-streamed premiere were donated to the UK mental health charity Mind.

In 2022 OutsideXbox advertised that it was looking to hire a new producer with the aim of expanding its Oxventure brand, and in September that year the Oxventure was relaunched under its own dedicated YouTube channel 'Oxventure', moving all previously uploaded Oxventure videos to it and beginning a new season titled 'Legacy of Dragons'.

Discography

References

External links 
 Outside Xbox
 Outside Xtra
 
 
 
 

British video bloggers
British YouTubers
Comedy YouTubers
Dungeons & Dragons
English-language YouTube channels
Fantasy podcasts
Gaming YouTubers
Let's Players
Video gaming in the United Kingdom
YouTube channels launched in 2012
YouTube channels launched in 2016
YouTube vloggers